Wheatley School is a co-educational, non-denominational, independent school in St. Catharines, Ontario, Canada. 

Wheatley  is organized into three divisions: primary (Age 2 to 6), lower elementary (Grades 1–4) and upper elementary (Grades 5–8). Wheatley is an International Baccalaureate (IB) World School with an average student-teacher ratio of 12:1.

Wheatley is governed by an independent Board of Directors. Wheatley school is accredited by the Canadian Council of Montessori Administrators and is a member of the Conference of Independent Schools of Ontario. Eda Varalli is the current Head of School.

History 
Founded in 1986 by Principal Eda Varalli with 36 students, Wheatley was incorporated in 1988 and became a non-profit organization. In 1991 the School moved to a larger facility. Between 1996 and 1999, three additional classrooms were added to accommodate increased enrolment.

In 2001, Wheatley moved to a large building on Scott Street, the former Scottlea Public School.

Academics 
Wheatley utilizes two proven educational methods: Montessori for children age 2 to grade 4 and the International Baccalaureate Middle Years Programme for Grades 5 to 8.

Facilities 
Wheatley's 20,000 square foot facility consists of classrooms, a library, gymnasium, Mac computer lab and wireless network. The school has a strict safety protocol – the facility is equipped with security cameras and all visitors must report to the office as all entrances are locked during school hours. The 7 acre campus includes a baseball diamond, soccer field, play structure, and a peace garden.

References

External links 
Wheatley School (http://www.wheatleyschool.com/)
 http://www.cisontario.ca/page.cfm?p=404&start=1
 http://www.ourkids.net/school/wheatley-school-st-catharines/140

Education in St. Catharines